James Joseph Dykes (November 10, 1896 – June 15, 1976) was an American professional baseball player, coach and manager. He played in Major League Baseball as a third and second baseman from  through , most notably as a member of the Philadelphia Athletics dynasty that won three consecutive American League pennants from 1929 to 1931 and, won the World Series in 1929 and 1930. He played his final six seasons for the Chicago White Sox.

Dykes batted over .300 five times during his career and was a member of one of the most feared batting orders in the history of baseball featuring three future Baseball Hall of Fame members (Al Simmons, Jimmie Foxx, and Mickey Cochrane). He also  excelled as a defensive player, leading the American League in assists once at second base and twice at third base, ending his career sixth in AL history in games at third base (1,253), and seventh in putouts (1,361), assists (2,403), total chances (3,952) and double plays (199).

At the time of his retirement, Dykes ranked eighth in American League history in games played (2,282), and ninth in at bats (8,046). He holds the Athletics franchise record for career doubles (365), and formerly held team marks for career games and at bats.

After his playing career, Dykes became the winningest manager in Chicago White Sox history with 899 victories over parts of 13 seasons, though his teams never finished above third place; he later became the first manager in history to win 1,000 games without capturing a league pennant.

Early career
Born in Philadelphia, Dykes played for three local teams at age 16 in 1913. The first was "his father's Penn Street Boys Club"; the second one paid 50 cents a game plus carfare (to Ardmore on the Main Line); the third paid $1 a game. By 19, Dykes played in the Delaware County League, which the major leagues declared an outlaw league a few years later, for infringing their control of the professional sport.

Dykes began his major league career on May 6, 1918, as a second baseman for the Athletics, and served in the wartime Army after the season ended. He spent most of 1919 in the minor leagues after reporting out of shape in spring training, but quickly became one of manager Connie Mack's favorite players with his defensive versatility and easygoing manner, and remained with the club for the next 14 years, primarily at third base.

With powerful wrists and reputedly the sport's best throwing arm, Dykes took advantage of Shibe Park's friendly dimensions to finish among the league leaders in home runs in 1921 and 1922, and batted .312, .323, and .324 in 1924, 1925 and 1927. He was named team MVP in 1924 and placed eighth in the league MVP vote in 1927.

In one 1927 game, he played every position except catcher and left fielder, even appearing as a relief pitcher. In 1929, Dykes had a career-high .327 batting average and was ninth in the American League in slugging, helping the Athletics win their first American League pennant in 15 years by 18 games over the New York Yankees of Babe Ruth and Lou Gehrig. He was one of six Athletics players to post batting averages above .310 during the 1929 season. Dykes capped the season by hitting .421 in the World Series against the Chicago Cubs; in Game 4, he had two hits and three runs batted in in a 10-run seventh inning as Philadelphia overcame an 8–0 deficit, and went on to win the Series in five games.

Late career
In 1930 Dykes batted .301 as the Athletics repeated as champions; in the 1930 World Series against the St. Louis Cardinals, he batted only .222, but drove in the winning run in Game 1 and had a 2-run home run in the final Game 6, a 7–1 victory.

In 1931, his batting average dropped to .273 as Philadelphia won its third straight pennant; but they lost their rematch with the Cardinals as he hit .227 in the 7-game Series.

Dykes had a disappointing year for the team in 1932 and with the onset of the Great Depression along with declining attendance, Connie Mack sought to reduce expenses by selling or trading his best players. In September 1932, he sold Dykes, Simmons and Mule Haas to the Chicago White Sox for $100,000 and a few months later sent Lefty Grove, Rube Walberg and Max Bishop to the Boston Red Sox for Bob Kline, Rabbit Warstler and $125,000. While with the White Sox, he was selected to the first two All-Star Games in 1933 and 1934.

In 22 seasons, Dykes was a career .280 hitter with 2,256 hits, 108 home runs, 1,108 runs and 1,069 RBI in 2,282 games, along with 453 doubles and 90 triples. His 115 times being hit by a pitch ranked second in AL history behind Kid Elberfeld's 142, and his 850 strikeouts ranked fourth in major league history. He was the last active major leaguer who had played in the 1910s. His Athletics team records of 1,702 games and 6,023 at-bats were broken in the 1970s by Bert Campaneris after the franchise relocated to Oakland.

Managerial career
Early in the 1934 season, he succeeded Lew Fonseca as White Sox manager. He was the team's player-manager until 1939. However, his last year as a full-time player was 1936; after that season, he only made cameo appearances in a total of 58 games. After formally retiring as a player in 1939, he continued as manager until early 1946. The White Sox finished in third place three times in his tenure. In 1936, they finished 81–70 (with two ties) while tied in percentage (.536) with the Washington Senators for third place. While they were 20 games behind the New York Yankees, it was the first time they had been a factor in a pennant race that late in any season since 1920, a year in which the team was decimated late in the season by the suspension (and eventual permanent banning from baseball) of the "Black Sox." It was also only their third winning season since 1920.

His best finish with the White Sox was the 1937 season, when they finished with an 86–68 record, which was good for another third-place finish, 16 games behind the Yankees. They finished in third place in 1941 at 77–77 (with 2 ties) and 24 games back of the Yankees. The White Sox did not place as high as 3rd place again until 1952. The worst finish for the White Sox during his tenure was the 49–88 record in his first year; his 10–20 record during his last season in 1946 was his worst in terms of percentage.

As a manager, he proved more combative and argumentative than he had been as a player, and was often fined and suspended; his 62 ejections were among the all-time top ten when he retired. After Ted Lyons replaced him as White Sox manager, Dykes managed two years in the minor leagues with the White Sox' top minor league affiliate, the Hollywood Stars. He returned to the majors in 1949 as a coach with the Athletics.  On May 26, 1950–one month into the season–he was promoted to assistant manager. It was also announced Mack would retire after the 1950 season after 50 years at the helm, and Dykes would succeed him for the 1951 season. However, Dykes essentially became the A's de facto manager for the remainder of the 1950 season. He was given primary responsibility for day-to-day operations, took over as the team's main game-day operator, and split control over most baseball matters with former teammate Mickey Cochrane, who became general manager.  Although Mack, who by this time was now sole owner of the club, maintained his position as team president, he was now a figurehead.  Dykes remained as manager until the end of the 1953 season. In his three seasons with the Athletics, the team finished 6th, 4th, and 7th, respectively. The 1952 season had them finish 79–75 (16 games behind the Yankees). It would be the franchise's last .500 season until 1968.
 

Dykes was named the Baltimore Orioles' first manager in 1954 after that franchise relocated from St. Louis. In his only season with the team, he went 54–100 — the only 100 loss season in his managerial career. Dykes left in a team reorganization which ended with Paul Richards becoming both field and general manager in 1955. After 35 years in the American League, Dykes became a coach with the National League's Cincinnati Redlegs, leading them as interim manager for the last 41 games of the 1958 season after Birdie Tebbetts was fired. However, he came back to the AL as manager of the Detroit Tigers in 1959. The Tigers team had lost 15 of their first 17 games under Bill Norman before being fired one month into the season at which Dykes was hired. His 1959 team went 74–63 (while finishing 76–78 overall), good for 4th place and 18 games behind his old White Sox team. He managed them to a 44–52 record in 1960. At that point, Frank Lane, then general manager of the Cleveland Indians and famous for his numerous transactions, sent Joe Gordon to Detroit and brought Dykes to Cleveland in a rare trade of managers. Dykes managed the Indians from 1960–1961. His teams went 26–32 and 77–83.

In 21 seasons as a manager, Dykes compiled a 1,406–1,541 record, never winning a pennant or finishing higher than third place. After serving as a coach for the Milwaukee Braves in 1962, he returned to the Athletics, who had by then moved to Kansas City, in 1963. He retired after the 1964 season, ending 47 years at field level in baseball. Although he had a different style of managing his teams, Dykes had authority, was testy and combative; he liked to make use of his entire roster and was regarded as a motivator of players.

Dykes co-authored the 1967 memoir You Can't Steal First Base with Charles O. Dexter.

In a 1954 news story, Dykes was characterized as generally well liked by the players under him. "He's a pretty good guy," one Oriole said, "he doesn't say much but he knows how to put you straight when he has to." "Everyone feels pretty good under him," another player said. "You know he expects you to play ball but he doesn't come around and bother you about it." Dykes was known as a practical jokester and was especially fond of exploding cigars which he passed out like candy. At one time he got confused when handing one to a sportswriter he knew, which exploded in his own face in front of the intended victim; "got my hands crossed", Dykes explained.

When it came to the integration of baseball, Dykes had a mixed record. He recognized the talent of Jackie Robinson and other Black players, but was later recalled as having refused to pose with Robinson for a photograph, and was accused of calling for his pitcher to intentionally hit Minnie Miñoso, using a racial slur.

Dykes died in Philadelphia at age 79.

Managerial record

See also

 List of Major League Baseball career hits leaders
 List of Major League Baseball career doubles leaders
 List of Major League Baseball career runs scored leaders
 List of Major League Baseball career runs batted in leaders
 List of Major League Baseball managers by wins
 List of Major League Baseball player-managers

References

External links

1896 births
1976 deaths
American League All-Stars
Atlanta Crackers players
Baltimore Orioles managers
Baseball players from Philadelphia
Chicago White Sox managers
Chicago White Sox players
Cincinnati Redlegs coaches
Cincinnati Redlegs managers
Cleveland Indians managers
Detroit Tigers managers
Gettysburg Ponies players
Hanover Raiders players
Hollywood Stars managers
Kansas City Athletics coaches
Major League Baseball player-managers
Major League Baseball second basemen
Major League Baseball third base coaches
Major League Baseball third basemen
Milwaukee Braves coaches
Philadelphia Athletics coaches
Philadelphia Athletics managers
Philadelphia Athletics players
Pittsburgh Pirates coaches